ISO 3166-2:BF is the entry for Burkina Faso in ISO 3166-2, part of the ISO 3166 standard published by the International Organization for Standardization (ISO), which defines codes for the names of the principal subdivisions (e.g., provinces or states) of all countries coded in ISO 3166-1.

Currently for Burkina Faso, ISO 3166-2 codes are defined for two levels of subdivisions:
 13 regions
 45 provinces

Each code consists of two parts, separated by a hyphen. The second part is either of the following:
 two digits (01–13): regions
 three letters: provinces

Current codes
Subdivision names are listed as in the ISO 3166-2 standard published by the ISO 3166 Maintenance Agency (ISO 3166/MA).

Click on the button in the header to sort each column.

Regions

Provinces

Changes
The following changes to the entry have been announced in newsletters by the ISO 3166/MA since the first publication of ISO 3166-2 in 1998. ISO stopped issuing newsletters in 2013.

The following changes to the entry are listed on ISO's online catalogue, the Online Browsing Platform:

See also
 Subdivisions of Burkina Faso
 FIPS region codes of Burkina Faso

External links
 ISO Online Browsing Platform: BF
 Provinces of Burkina Faso, Statoids.com

2:BF
ISO 3166-2
ISO 3166-2
Burkina Faso geography-related lists